Neulapur is a village development committee in Bardiya District in Lumbini Province of south-western Nepal. At the time of the 1991 Nepal census it had a population of 8,194 and had 1053 houses in the town.

Media 
To Promote local culture Neulapur has two FM radio stations Phoolbari FM - 107.3 MHz and Radio Tiger FM - 88.2 MHz Which are Community radio Station.

References

Populated places in Bardiya District